Central Pattaya (previously known as CentralFestival Pattaya Beach) is a shopping mall in Pattaya, Thailand.  The mall opened in 2009 and was the first shopping mall of Central Pattaya, Thailand's largest retail corporation under the "Central Pattaya" brand.

Overview
The mall has a retail podium of 200,000 m2 on 7 floors. It houses more than 370 retail shops, 5 anchors including an entertainment complex, a 5-floor central department store and has direct access to a 302-room hotel, the Hilton Pattaya. The mall is situated at approximately Pattaya Beach Soi 9, and one side of the mall is next to Pattaya 2nd Road, while the other side is at Pattaya Beach Road. The complex also houses the Pattaya Hilton Hotel, which opened in November 2010.

Anchors 
 Central Department Store
 Tops Food Hall
 SFX Cinema 10 Cinema
 Hilton Hotel Pattaya
 B2S
 Power Buy
 Supersports
 Food Park

Parking
The mall is capable of providing parking places for over 2,000 vehicles.

See also 
 List of shopping malls in Thailand

Notes

References

External links 
 CentralFestival website
 Hilton Pattaya website
 CentralFestival Pattaya Beach

Buildings and structures in Pattaya
Shopping malls in Thailand
Central Pattana
Shopping malls established in 2009
Tourist attractions in Chonburi province
2009 establishments in Thailand